WEDAL (Westdeutschland-Anbindungsleitung) is a  long German natural gas pipeline, which connects the MIDAL pipeline with the Belgian natural gas grid. WEDAL branches off the MIDAL pipeline in Bad Salzuflen. From there the pipeline runs to Soest and further across North Rhine-Westphalia to the connection at the Belgian border near Aachen. The construction of WEDAL started in 1996 and the pipeline was completed in 1998. WEDAL is owned and operated by Wingas GmbH & Co. KG.

See also

 JAGAL
 STEGAL
 NEL pipeline

External links
 WEDAL website by Wingas

Energy infrastructure completed in 1998
Natural gas pipelines in Germany